William Barnett (March 4, 1761 – April 1832) was an American slave owner, politician and soldier.

Early life 

William Barnett was born in Amherst County in the Virginia Colony on March 4, 1761, to Nathaniel and Susanna (née Crawford). Early in his life, they moved to Columbia County, Georgia. He had a brother Joel.

American Revolutionary War 
At the start of the American Revolution, Barnett and his brother returned to Virginia to fight under Marquis de Lafayette and were participants in the surrender of Cornwallis at the Siege of Yorktown.

Political career 

Married 1785 to Mary Meriwether.

Barnett returned to Elbert County, Georgia, after the war and settled on the Broad River. He was the county sheriff from some time and was elected to the Georgia Senate and presided as that body's president. Upon the resignation of Howell Cobb in 1812 to accept a captain's commission in the United States Army to fight in the War of 1812, Barnett was elected as Democratic-Republican to the 13th United States Congress and served from October 5, 1812, until March 3, 1815.

After his congressional service, Barnett was appointed in 1815 as a commissioner to establish the boundaries of the Creek Indian reservation.

Later life and death 
He moved to Montgomery County, Alabama and died there in April 1832. He was buried in the Gilmer-Christian-Barnett Cemetery, near Mathews Station in that county.

References

Notes

External links 
 Letter 1804 July 19, Knoxville, Tennessee, to Colonel William Barnett and Brigadier General Buckner Harris, Jackson County, Georgia / John Sevier, Governor of Tennessee from the Digital Library of Georgia

1761 births
1832 deaths
People from Amherst County, Virginia
People from Columbia County, Georgia
People from Elbert County, Georgia
Georgia (U.S. state) state senators
Continental Army soldiers
People of Georgia (U.S. state) in the American Revolution
People from Montgomery County, Alabama
Democratic-Republican Party members of the United States House of Representatives from Georgia (U.S. state)